Rüdiger Emshoff (born April 5, 1960 in Mülheim an der Ruhr) is a German oral and maxillofacial surgeon and associate professor at the Medical University of Innsbruck, where he is head of the Orofacial Pain and Temporomandibular Disorder Unit. Emshoff is known for his work in the field of chronic orofacial pain management with a focus on the development of non-invasive and minimally-invasive methods in the diagnosis and treatment of temporomandibular joint dysfunction.

Early life and education 
Emshoff is the son of Horst Werner and Gisela Sophie-Luise Emshoff of Mülheim an der Ruhr, Germany. Rüdiger Emshoff studied medicine, philosophy and dentistry at the Heinrich-Heine-Universität Düsseldorf and at the Semmelweis-Universität in Budapest. He earned a medical doctorate from the University of Düsseldorf in Germany in 1987. In 1990 he received a dental doctorate from the Semmelweis University in Budapest. Emshoff completed his residency in oral and maxillofacial surgery (1991–1998) at the Medical University of Innsbruck. He is board certified in oral and maxillofacial surgery.

Scientific career 

In 2001, Emshoff became an associate professor in oral and maxillofacial surgery at the Medical University of Innsbruck. Since 2001 Emshoff has been a consultant at the University Hospital for Cranio-Maxillofacial and Oral Surgery at the Medical University of Innsbruck. Since 1998 he has been the head of the Orofacial Pain and Temporomandibular Disorder Unit.

Personal and family 
In 2002, Rüdiger Emshoff married to the doctor Iris Emshoff and has three children with her (Sophia, Ida Marie Gunilla, and Niels Ingmar Rüdiger). Together, the family lives in Innsbruck.

Clinical research contributions 

His clinical research focused on the development of rehabilitation methods of treating chronic facial pain. Also he did research on non-invasive imaging techniques to detect internal derangments and degenerative diseases of the temporomandibular joint.

In 1997, he introduced ultrasonography as a new temporomandibular joint imaging modality, a technique which in the following decade has become one of the most recommended methods because of its noninvasiveness, inexpensiveness, and ability to evaluate the integrity of the temporomandibular joint.

In the early 2000s, he pioneered the application of minimally-invasive temporomandibular joint surgery which has become a standard treatment for certain types of chronic temporomandibular disorder pain.

Since the 2000s, Emshoff and his team have been working on a concept for integrating internal derangements and osteoarthrosis in the diagnostic approach to patients with temporomandibular joint pain. In 2003, Emshoff and colleagues were the first to demonstrate that concomitant morphological abnormalities of disc displacement and osteoarthrosis are not important factors in the pathogenesis of temporomandibular joint pain and dysfunction. This saves the patient from undergoing invasive arthroplastic procedures.

In 2008, Emshoff and coworkers conducted the first human clinical trial of a red low-level laser therapy for temporomandibular joint pain, a rehabilitation method which is currently being used worldwide.

Further, in 2011, he developed a conceptual model for the identification of clinically relevant effects in the field of chronic temporomandibular pain. In the following years, this model has been widely accepted to be used in randomised clinical trials designed to show improved efficacy in chronic pain patients.

Selected publications 
His most cited peer-reviewed journal articles are:

 R. Gassner R, Bösch R, Tuli T, Emshoff R. Prevalence of dental trauma in 6000 patients with facial injuries: implications for prevention. Oral Surgery, Oral Medicine, Oral Pathology, Oral Radiology, and Endodontology. 1999 Jan 1;87(1):27-33. (cited 259 times, according to Google Scholar).
Emshoff R, Bösch R, Pümpel E, Schöning H, Strobl H. Low-level laser therapy for treatment of temporomandibular joint pain: a double-blind and placebo-controlled trial. Oral Surgery, Oral Medicine, Oral Pathology, Oral Radiology, and Endodontology. 2008 Apr 1;105(4):452-6. (cited 174 times, according to Google Scholar ).
Bertram S, Rudisch A, Innerhofer K, Pümpel E, Grubwieser G, Emshoff R. Diagnosing TMJ internal derangement and osteoarthritis with magnetic resonance imaging. The Journal of the American Dental Association. 2001 Jun 1;132(6):753-61 (cited 155 times, according to Google Scholar ).
 Strobl H, Emshoff R, Röthler G. Conservative treatment of unilateral condylar fractures in children: a long‐term clinical and radiologic follow‐up of 55 patients. International Journal of Oral & Maxillofacial Surgery. 1999 Apr;28(2):95-8 (cited 127 times, according to Google Scholar ).
Emshoff R, Bertram S, Rudisch A, Gassner R. The diagnostic value of ultrasonography to determine the temporomandibular joint disk position. Oral Surgery, Oral Medicine, Oral Pathology, Oral Radiology, and Endodontology. 1997 Dec 1;84(6):688-96.   (cited 119 times, according to Google Scholar ).

Memberships in scientific organisations 
He is a member of various professional organizations, including:

New York Academy of Sciences (NYAS), since 2007.
Philosophy of Science Association (PSA), since 2007.
Society for Clinical Trials (SCT), since 2007.
American Academy of Orofacial Pain (AAOP), since 2012.
International Association for the Study of Pain (IASP), since 2018.
American Academy of Craniofacial Pain (AACFP), since 2021.

Journal editorial positions 
He has been a member of the editorial board of the journal Case Reports in Medicine, since 2008, Pain and Therapy, since 2018, and Diagnostics, since 2021.

Honors and awards 

 Hochschulpreis Endodontologie (Fachzeitschrift Endodontie) (2005).
Kürschners Deutscher Gelehrten-Kalender (De Gruyter) (2005, 2007, 2009, 2012–2022).

References

External links 

 Publications in US National Library of Medicine
 

21st-century German physicians
German maxillofacial surgeons
Living people
1960 births